Akwan Information Technologies was a search engine company based in Belo Horizonte, Brazil. It was acquired by Google on July 20, 2005.

References

Google acquisitions
Telecommunications companies of Brazil